The Calcutta Metropolitan Institute of Gerontology (CMIG) is a non-profit, voluntary organisation involved in research, publication, training, and service programs in gerontology. It is located in Kolkata, India. It was established in 1988.

The aims and objectives of CMIG are provide a meaningful life to the elderly and to integrate them with the mainstream of the society.

The Calcutta Metropolitan Institute of Gerontology is a non-profit, secular organisation has designed and carefully evaluated number of programs for the elderly belonging to different Socio Economic Statuses.

The institute offers a one-year postgraduate diploma course in Gerontology and Age Management, in collaboration with the University of Calcutta.

External links
 Official website
 Article on its association with CU
 By Indrani Chakravarty, Director, Calcutta Metropolitan Institute of Gerontology

Research institutes in Kolkata
Educational institutions established in 1988
University of Calcutta affiliates
Research institutes in West Bengal
Old age in India
Gerontology organizations
1988 establishments in West Bengal